is the first major single by the Japanese girl idol group Shiritsu Ebisu Chugaku. It was released in Japan on May 5, 2012, by Defstar Records.

Release details 
The single was released in three versions: Subculture Edition (Regular Edition), Limited Ē Edition, and Limited Bī Edition.

Members 
Shiritsu Ebisu Chugaku: Mizuki, Rika Mayama, Natsu Anno, Ayaka Yasumoto, Aika Hirota, Mirei Hoshina, Hirono Suzuki, Rina Matsuno, Hinata Kashiwagi

Track listing

Limited Ē Edition

Limited Bī Edition

Subculture Edition (Regular Edition)

Charts

References

External links 
 Entry on the Shiritsu Ebisu Chugaku official site
 Music videos on YouTube
 
 

Shiritsu Ebisu Chugaku songs
2012 singles
Japanese-language songs
Defstar Records singles
Songs written by Kenichi Maeyamada
2012 songs
Songs written by Katsuhiko Sugiyama